Azampur is a area of Uttara, a suburb of Dhaka, Bangladesh. There is a bus stop in the same name.

See also
 House Building, Uttara

References

External links
 Azampur Area Map

Bus stops in Bangladesh
Neighbourhoods in Dhaka
Uttara